2017 London attack may refer to any of four separate events:

 The 2017 Westminster attack on 22 March
 The 2017 London Bridge attack on 3 June
 The Finsbury Park attack on 19 June
 The Parsons Green bombing on 15 September